Braulio Armando Lara Peguero (December 20, 1988 – April 20, 2019)  was a Dominican professional baseball pitcher. He played in the KBO League for the SK Wyverns in 2016.

Career
Lara signed as an international free agent with the Tampa Bay Rays. The Miami Marlins selected Lara from the Rays in the 2012 Rule 5 draft, but returned him to the Rays before the 2013 season. In 2016, Lara signed with the SK Wyverns of the KBO League.

Lara signed a minor league pact with the Washington Nationals in November 2016 with an invitation to spring training. He elected free agency on November 6, 2017.

On February 20, 2018, Lara signed with the Sultanes de Monterrey of the Mexican Baseball League. He was traded to the Generales de Durango on April 28, 2018. Lara was released on May 5, 2018.

Death
Lara was killed in a car crash in the Dominican Republic on April 20, 2019.

References

External links

1988 births
2019 deaths
Bowling Green Hot Rods players
Charlotte Stone Crabs players
Dominican Republic baseball players
Dominican Republic expatriate baseball players in Mexico
Dominican Republic expatriate baseball players in South Korea
Dominican Republic expatriate baseball players in the United States
Mixed-race Dominicans
Dominican Summer League Rays players
Durham Bulls players
Generales de Durango players
Harrisburg Senators players
KBO League pitchers
Mexican League baseball pitchers
Montgomery Biscuits players
People from Baní
Princeton Rays players
Richmond Flying Squirrels players
Road incident deaths in the Dominican Republic
Sacramento River Cats players
SSG Landers players
Sultanes de Monterrey players
Tigres del Licey players